Blue Glacier is a large glacier located to the north of Mount Olympus in the Olympic Mountains of Washington. Just in the period from 1995 and 2006, Blue Glacier retreated .

Description

Starting at an elevation of  near Mount Olympus's three summits, the Blue Glacier begins as a snow/ice field separated by arêtes. As the glacier flows north, it cascades down a steep slope and thus, the smooth ice turns into a chaotic icefall, replete with seracs and crevasses. After the ice passes the icefall, the glacier ends up in a valley and takes a left turn to the west. The rocky cliff used to host a second icefall before the terminus of Blue Glacier retreated up the cliff.

A weather station operated from 1957 to 1963 at an elevation of 6910 ft near the glacier recorded rain and snowfall events, and average temperatures.  However, the temperature record is irregular and contains mostly summer months. Nevertheless, at least one snow event occurred in all twelve months during the six years the station was operated.

Hydrology
Due to orographic lift and the glacier's proximity to the Pacific Ocean, more precipitation falls on the Blue Glacier than any other glacier in the lower 48 United States. About  of precipitation falls on the upper reaches of Mount Olympus and Blue Glacier each year. During winter, most of the precipitation on Blue Glacier consists of snow. In addition, a significant amount of rain falls on the Blue Glacier as well, especially during spring and summer. Because of this high precipitation and the volume of this body of ice, the Blue Glacier contributes a significant amount of water to the Hoh River via Glacier Creek. The Hoh River eventually discharges in the Pacific Ocean after flowing down  through temperate rain forest in Olympic National Park.

See also
List of glaciers in the United States
Edward LaChapelle

References

Glaciers of the Olympic Mountains
Glaciers of Jefferson County, Washington
Glaciers of Washington (state)